Madhu Chandra is a 1979 Indian Kannada-language film, directed by Ramesh-Shivaram. The film stars Shankar Nag, Jayamala, Ramakrishna and Mamatha Shenoy in lead roles. The film had musical score by T. G. Lingappa.

Cast

Shankar Nag
Jayamala
Ramakrishna
Mamatha Shenoy
K. R. Shantharam
Sharapanjara Iyengar
Umesh
Ashalatha
Sathyanand
Raju
Shanthi

References

External links
 

1970s Kannada-language films
Films scored by T. G. Lingappa